Ashlee Jenae Slayback (born December 1, 1985) is an American soccer forward who last played for Saint Louis Athletica of Women's Professional Soccer. In the fall of 2009 she was appointed the new head coach of Ursuline Academy Varsity Soccer.

College 
As a senior at Texas A&M, she won the Honda Sports Award as the nation's top soccer player. In 2014, she was inducted into the Texas A&M Athletic Hall of Fame.

References

External links
 Saint Louis Athletica player profile
 Texas A&M player profile
 Illinois State coach profile

1985 births
Living people
Saint Louis Athletica players
Texas A&M University alumni
Texas A&M Aggies women's soccer players
American women's soccer players
Women's association football forwards
Women's Professional Soccer players
Boston Renegades players
USL W-League (1995–2015) players